City Tower is the tallest skyscraper in Prague (Pankrác district) and in Bohemia, and the second tallest one in the Czech Republic standing on the Pankrác Plain with a height of 109 meters.

History 
Construction commenced in 1985 and the building was designated as the headquarters of Československý rozhlas (now Český rozhlas; a Czech public radio broadcaster). In 1993, the building was nearly completed, but appeared to be oversized for Český rozhlas (which split from Československý rozhlas after the Dissolution of Czechoslovakia), technically obsolete and full of dangerous asbestos.

In later years Český rozhlas tried to sell the uncompleted building. In 1996, an agreement was signed with the company NIKO to sell the building for 1 billion CZK, but subsequently failed to pay the agreed amount. A similar scenario happened one year later with the Singaporean company Wells Holding and an agreed selling price of 550 million CZK. Finally the building was sold in 1999 to the company ECM for just 285 million CZK.

After a long planning process and legislative planning steps the radical reconstruction of the building, designed by Richard Meier, began in 2005 and was completed in 2008. On 20 December 2007 the building obtained final building approval. The first tenants started to move into the building at the beginning of 2008. The largest renter is Raiffeisenbank, a.s. which occupies 10 floors of the building with about 1200 employees.

Over 2300 tons of new steel structures were used for its reconstruction. The facade consists of 30,500 m2 of glass sheets. 800 parking spaces were built in the underground floors. There are 18 lifts in the building. Elevators reach speeds of up to 6 meters per second and the official web page claims they are the fastest lifts in the Czech Republic. On the 27th floor is the highest restaurant in the Czech Republic, it has been since 2013 repeatedly awarded Michelin's Bib Gourmand award.

In 2009 ECM sold City Tower for €130 millions to Czech company Marpona a.s. Transaction was backed up by J&T. In 2012, the building was sold again, to company Consideratio which belongs under holding Proxy-Finance. The price was not published.

Gallery

See also 
 List of tallest buildings in Prague
 List of tallest buildings in the Czech Republic

References

External links 

  (in English)
 City Tower on ECM website
 Article about building history 

Richard Meier buildings
Skyscraper office buildings in the Czech Republic
Office buildings completed in 2008
Skyscrapers in Prague
Retail buildings in the Czech Republic
2008 establishments in the Czech Republic
21st-century architecture in the Czech Republic